Danny Diver (born 15 November 1966, in Paisley) is a Scottish former football player and manager.

He was manager of Scottish Third Division club East Stirlingshire. Diver resigned from this position in March 2003 and was replaced by Steve Morrison, his former assistant.

Diver's dispute with the Belgian club R.R.C. Tournaisien in the late 1980s in connection with player registration contributed to the later legal framework for the Bosman ruling.

Playing career

  St Mirren (1982–84)
  Kolding IF (1984)
  Motherwell (1984–85) 0 apps 0 goals
  Morton (1985–86) 4 apps 1 goal
  RC Tournai (1986–88)
  Albion Rovers (1988–89) 22 apps 3 goals
  East Stirlingshire (1989–92) 84 apps 28 goals
  Stranraer (1992–93) 30 apps 15 goals
  Arbroath (1993) 21 apps 10 goals
  Alloa Athletic (1993–96) 46 apps 9 goals
  Hamilton Academical (1996) 4 apps 0 goals
  Ayr United (1996) 9 apps 4 goals
  Pollok (1996–98)
  Maryhill Juniors (1998–99)
  Shotts Bon Accord (1999-00)
  Shettleston (2000–01)
  Neilston Juniors (2001–02)
  East Stirlingshire (2002–03) 1 app 0 goals

References

External links 
 

Scottish football managers
East Stirlingshire F.C. managers
Shotts Bon Accord F.C. players
Living people
1956 births
Footballers from Paisley, Renfrewshire
Scottish footballers
Association football forwards
St Mirren F.C. players
Kolding IF players
Motherwell F.C. players
Greenock Morton F.C. players
Scottish expatriate footballers
Expatriate men's footballers in Denmark
Expatriate footballers in Belgium
Scottish expatriate sportspeople in Denmark
Scottish expatriate sportspeople in Belgium
Albion Rovers F.C. players
East Stirlingshire F.C. players
Stranraer F.C. players
Arbroath F.C. players
Alloa Athletic F.C. players
Hamilton Academical F.C. players
Ayr United F.C. players
Maryhill F.C. players
Glasgow United F.C. players
Scottish Football League players
Pollok F.C. players
Scottish Football League managers
Scotland junior international footballers
Scottish Junior Football Association players